Alison Rose (born 1961) is an English diplomat and principal of Newnham College, Cambridge.

Alison Rose may also refer to:

 Dame Alison Rose (banker) (born 1969), British banking executive
 Alison Rose (golfer) (born 1968), Scottish golfer
 Alison E. Rose, Canadian documentary film director